Lars Hedén (born 4 September 1934) is a Swedish former football player and manager.

References

 Profile

1934 births
Living people
Swedish footballers
AIK Fotboll players
Allsvenskan players
Swedish football managers
IF Elfsborg managers
GAIS managers

Association football midfielders